Éva Kondorosi is a Hungarian biochemist who is known for her work on Rhizobium-legume symbiosis. She has been a member of the National Academy of Sciences since 2010. In 2015 she became a member of the German Academy of Sciences Leopoldina, and in 2020 she was appointed as a Chief Scientific Advisor to the European Commission.

References

External links

Hungarian women scientists
Hungarian biochemists
Women biochemists
Year of birth missing (living people)
Living people
Members of the German Academy of Sciences Leopoldina